State Highway 85 (SH 85) is a state highway in the U.S. state of Texas that runs almost  from Carrizo Springs to Charlotte.

History

SH 85 was originally designated on August 21, 1923 along a route from Eagle Pass to Dilley via Carrizo Springs. On February 17, 1925, it extended to Del Rio. On September 28, 1950, the section from Del Rio to Carrizo Springs was transferred to newly extended U.S. Highway 277.  SH 85 was extended along its current route to Charlotte on December 17, 1961.

Route description
SH 85 begins at an intersection with US 83 in Carrizo Springs.  The highway heads east from this junction and has an intersection with FM 1917 before leaving Carrizo Springs.  East of the city, the highway heads to the northeast as it intersects FM 1556 and FM 1407 and passes near the Dimmit County Airport.  The highway turns back towards the east before a crossing of the Nueces River.  SH 85 turns back towards the northeast after the river crossing before turning back towards the east near Brundage, where it has an intersection with FM 65.  The highway continues to the east as it heads towards Big Wells, where it intersects FM 1867.  East of Big Wells, the highway once again turns towards the northeast near an intersection with FM 468.  SH 85 curves towards the north-northeast before entering Frio County.  Once in Frio County, the highway curves back to the east.  It curves back towards the northeast as it approaches the city of Dilley.  In Dilley, SH 85 has an interchange with I-35.  Heading east from Dilley, the highway turns back towards the northeast before crossing the Frio River.  SH 85 continues northeast to an intersection with FM 1582 before crossing into Atascosa County.  The highway curves back to the east as it enters Atascosa County.  The highway ends at SH 97 west of the city limits of Charlotte.

Junction list

References

Transportation in Dimmit County, Texas
Transportation in Frio County, Texas
Transportation in Atascosa County, Texas
085